Diana Nenova (born ) is a Bulgarian female volleyball player. She is a member of the Bulgaria women's national volleyball team and played for Dinamo București in 2014. 

She was part of the Bulgarian national team at the 2014 FIVB Volleyball Women's World Championship in Italy.
She competed at the 2009 Women's European Volleyball Championship.

Clubs
  Dinamo București (2014)

References

1985 births
Living people
Bulgarian women's volleyball players
Place of birth missing (living people)
Setters (volleyball)
Expatriate volleyball players in Romania
Bulgarian expatriate sportspeople in Romania